Hospitaalpark is a 71% white suburb of the city of Bloemfontein in South Africa.
All the streetnames are named after people who contributed to medicine.

References

Suburbs of Bloemfontein